Group B of the 2001 Fed Cup World Group was one of two pools in the World Group of the 2001 Fed Cup. Four teams competed in a round robin competition, with the top team advancing to the final.

Belgium vs. Germany

Spain vs. Australia

Germany vs. Australia

Belgium vs. Australia

Spain vs. Germany

Belgium vs. Spain

See also
Fed Cup structure

References

External links
 Fed Cup website

2001 Fed Cup World Group